= Ambalikoppa =

- Village
- Location in Karnataka, India
- Coordinates: 15°21′20″N 74°56′35″E
- Country: India
- State: Karnataka
- District: Dharwad

Government
  - Body: Village Panchayat

Population (2011)
  - Total: 1,081

Languages
  - Official: Kannada
- Time zone: UTC+5:30 (IST)
- ISO 3166 code: IN-KA
- Vehicle registration: KA
- Website: karnataka.gov.in

Ambalikoppa is a village in Dharwad district of Karnataka, India.

== Demographics ==
As of the 2011 Census of India there were 215 households in Ambalikoppa and a total population of 1,081 consisting of 552 males and 529 females. There were 171 children ages 0–6.
